Sylvia Burns is a South African international lawn bowler.

Bowls career
She won a gold medal in the Women's Triples at the 2008 World Outdoor Bowls Championship in Christchurch.

In 2007, she won the fours silver medal at the Atlantic Bowls Championships

In 2009 she won another fours silver medal at the Atlantic Bowls Championships and in 2015 she won the triples and fours bronze medals at the Atlantic Bowls Championships.

In 2016, she won a bronze medal with Susan Nel and Elma Davis in the triples at the 2016 World Outdoor Bowls Championship in Christchurch.

She won the 2017 pairs title at the National Championships bowling for the Edgemead Bowls Club.

References

Living people
South African female bowls players
1955 births